Robyn Anne Preston is an Australian politician. She has been a member of the New South Wales Legislative Assembly since 2019, representing Hawkesbury for the Liberal Party. Her Electorate Office is situated within the grounds of Western Sydney University in Richmond.

Preston served on The Hills Shire Council for ten years, including a period as Deputy Mayor, and was also Australia's first female rugby league commentator on commercial television.

At age 22 in 1980, Preston appeared as a centrefold model in Penthouse Magazine under the pseudonym of Kelly Russell. The photos re-emerged in 2018 as she was seeking preselection for the seat she eventually won and in 2012 as she sought to be elected to The Hills Shire Council. One of the people who had circulated them in 2018 was Peter Poulos who became a member of the Legislative Council in 2021 and was publicly criticised for it in the leadup to the 2023 election.

References

External links 

 Official Website
 

Year of birth missing (living people)
Living people
Liberal Party of Australia members of the Parliament of New South Wales
Members of the New South Wales Legislative Assembly
Women members of the New South Wales Legislative Assembly
The Hills Shire
21st-century Australian politicians
21st-century Australian women politicians